Hitoto is a surname. Notable people with the surname include:

Roger Hitoto (born 1969), Democratic Republic of the Congo footballer
, Japanese actress
, Japanese singer

Japanese-language surnames